Air Marshal Sir Roderick Harvey Goodall (19 January 1947 - 18 June 2021) was a senior Royal Air Force commander of the late 20th and early 21st century. He commanded the RAF detachment in Bahrain in the lead up to the Gulf War.

External links
The Telegraph - Air Marshal Sir Roderick Goodall obituary

1947 births
2021 deaths
Royal Air Force air marshals
Knights Bachelor